Tektin-1 is a protein that in humans is encoded by the TEKT1 gene.

Function 

This gene product belongs to the tektin family of proteins. Tektins comprise a family of filament-forming proteins that are coassembled with tubulins to form ciliary and flagellar microtubules. This gene is predominantly expressed in the testis and in mouse, tektin 1 mRNA was localized to the spermatocytes and round spermatids in the seminiferous tubules, indicating that it may play a role in spermatogenesis.

References

Further reading